Dubrovka is a rural locality (a village) in Urgushevsky Selsoviet, Karaidelsky District, Bashkortostan, Russia. The population was 110 as of 2010. There are 4 streets.

Geography 
Dubrovka is located 44 km southwest of Karaidel (the district's administrative centre) by road. Atnyashkino is the nearest rural locality.

References 

Rural localities in Karaidelsky District